Lyon Open may refer to:

ATP Lyon Open, a men's professional tennis tournament
WTA Lyon Open, a women's professional tennis tournament